Edwin Siu (born 23 March 1977) is a Hong Kong actor and singer. Siu started his career as an idol singer and was formerly managed by Music Nation Group. In 2002, Siu left the Hong Kong entertainment industry to start his career in mainland China. In 2008, he returned to Hong Kong and signed an artiste contract with TVB.

Early life and career
Siu became popular in high school as a singer. In 2001, he distinguished himself in a singing contest and was signed by Music Nation Group as a singer and found early success. After a fierce competition with new singers including Juno Mak and Shawn Yue, he won the Rookie of the Year award.  However, Siu's initial success ended abruptly in 2002 after he made the controversial statement “the good will always prevail” at the party after 2002 JSG award . The following day his comment was taken out of context with news reports claiming that Siu's comments were made towards fellow singer Juno Mak, who was known for his wealthy father's backing of his career, angering Mak's supporters and fans. Siu's career plummeted immediately and was sent by his management company to restart his career in mainland China. He was sent to Beijing and was eventually dropped by his management company in 2004, preventing him from releasing any new albums. Siu has said 2004 was one of his most depressing year as his career spiraled downhill and his father also died.

Finding little success in mainland and missing his family, Siu returned to Hong Kong in 2008 to sign with TVB as an actor. Starting with minor supporting roles he eventually climbed to lead roles at TVB. In 2012, he starred in the TV drama Daddy Good Deeds playing the character "Yip Kwai" with an image that subverted from his early career.  The role brought him his first TVB acting nomination as a supporting actor. In response to his role, Siu remarked that “It was too easy for me to succeed in the past, then I became arrogant. I often lost my temper when I felt unhappy with some small thing. But now I knew that rather to have a sudden rise in life, I prefer to work hard step-by-step. I was fortunately to have this opportunity to reintroduce my image to the public.” In addition to his role on Daddy Good Deeds, he also sang the drama‘a theme song, which was well received.

In 2013, Siu starred as the lead actor, co-leading with Ruco Chan in the TVB drama Brother's Keeper. His character "Law Wai-son" brought him further recognition as an actor. After the success of Brother's Keeper, Siu was given more opportunities as a lead actor.

Personal life
Siu is good friends with actors Wayne Lai, Raymond Cho, Raymond Wong and Power Chan. The five together have starred in TVB dramas The Confidant and Overachievers.

In 2014, Siu began dating Madam Cutie On Duty co-star Priscilla Wong. At the 2018 TVB Anniversary Awards, the couple announced that they had got married earlier that year.

Filmography

TVB television series

Shaw Brothers television series

Mainland Chinese television series

Films

Web series

Discography

Studio albums

Television themes

Awards and nominations

Music

Acting

References

External links 

 

1977 births
Living people
Cantopop singers
Cantonese-language singers
Hong Kong Mandopop singers
Hong Kong male singers
TVB actors
21st-century Hong Kong male actors
Hong Kong male television actors
Hong Kong male film actors
Alumni of the City University of Hong Kong
21st-century Hong Kong male singers